Fritz Friedrichs (17 May 1882, Hamburg - 28 July 1928, Hoopte, Harburg District) was a German Post-Impressionist painter.

Biography 
After completing his primary education in 1898, he enrolled at the Kunstgewerbeschule in Hamburg and, two years later, became a student of Arthur Siebelist.

Their showing was highly praised by Alfred Lichtwark, head of the Kunsthalle Hamburg.

He took a study trip to the Netherlands in 1908 and, in 1909, exhibited with Die Brücke. The following year, he established his own private art school at his studio. In 1911, he began working as an art critic and married Gertrud Harlos, one of his models.

At the beginning of World War I, he was drafted and sent to Poland. After spending some time in a military hospital, he was discharged and went back to exhibiting, notably with the Free Secession in 1919.

He died in 1928, following a long illness. A major retrospective of his work, "Die Siebelistschüler Fritz Friedrichs und Walter Voltmer" was presented by the Hamburgische Landesbank in 1991.

Sources 
 Friedrich Ahlers-Hestermann: Zwischen zwei Fronten – Fritz Friedrichs und unsere Generation, in: Der Kreis, Vol.6, #5/6, 1929
 Carsten Meyer-Tönnesmann: Der Hamburgische Künstlerclub von 1897. Verlag Atelier im Bauernhaus, Fischerhude 1997.

External links 

 ArtNet: More works by Friedrichs.

1882 births
1928 deaths
20th-century German painters
20th-century German male artists
German male painters
Post-impressionist painters
Artists from Hamburg